Yorro is a Local Government Area in Taraba State, Northeast, Nigeria. Its headquarters is in the town of Kpantisawa. The local government is dominated by Mumuye people which is the largest tribe in Taraba State.

It has an area of 1,275 km and a population of 89,410 at the 2006 census. The Local Government have the following major towns and communities: Kpantisawa, Pupule, Lankaviri, Kassa, Nyaja, Dila, Kajong, Kayya, Donkin, Gadda-Lasheke, Boboto, Nyaladi, Nyalapa,  Dandikulu, Manang-kopo, Bolisabo, Jika, Manang-lakware, Kpantinapo, Mika, Santewa, Garin Malam Audu etc. 

The postal code of the area is 661.

References

Local Government Areas in Taraba State